The 24th Golden Disc Awards were held December 10, 2009. They recognized accomplishments by musicians from the previous year.

Presenters 
 Jung Yong-hwa
 Kim So-eun
 Oh Ji-eun
 Lee Chung-ah
 Jeong Ga-eun
 Jeon Hye-bin
 Go Eun-ah
 Ha Seok-jin
 Lee Si-young
 Lee Wan
 Seo Hyo-rim
 Yoon Eun-hye
 Lee Yeon-hee

Winners and nominees

Main awards
Winners and nominees are listed in alphabetical order. Winners are listed first and emphasized in bold.

Other awards
 Record Producer of the Year: Lee Ho-yeon (president of DSP Media)
 Lifetime Achievement Award: Song Chang-sik (singer-songwriter)

References

External links 
 Official website

24
2009 music awards
2009 in South Korean music
December 2009 events in South Korea